Scratching the Door: The First Recordings of the Flaming Lips is a rarities album of the very first recordings made by the American experimental rock group The Flaming Lips, including their self-titled EP and the demos for the band's first album, Hear It Is.

Release
On February 28, 2018, the release of this album and another compilation, Seeing the Unseeable: The Complete Studio Recordings of the Flaming Lips 1986-1990 was announced.

Reception

AllMusic's Heather Phares stated that it "is an entertaining reminder of just how much the band changed over the years", concluding that it's "a suitably gonzo document of the early days of one of indie's most idiosyncratic yet definitive acts". Under the Radar's Frank Valish proclaimed "What is surprising, listening to these recordings 30-some years later, is how well they stand up in light of the band's more lauded work", concluding "But ultimately, Scratching the Door is more than mere historical document. It's a still vital collection and reminder that The Flaming Lips didn't begin with The Soft Bulletin or even "She Don't Use Jelly". They were exciting from the start".

Track listing
All tracks written by The Flaming Lips unless otherwise noted. Track listing and credits partially adapted from liner notes.

References

2018 compilation albums
The Flaming Lips compilation albums